The Arica y Parinacota Region is one of Chile's 16 first order administrative divisions. It comprises two provinces, Arica and Parinacota. It borders Peru's Department of Tacna to the north, Bolivia's La Paz and Oruro departments to the east and Chile's Tarapacá Region to the south. Arica y Parinacota is the 5th smallest, the 3rd least populous and the 6th least densely populated of the regions of Chile. Arica is the region's capital and largest city.

The region was a former Peruvian province, which was occupied by Chile under the 1883 Treaty of Ancón at the close of the War of the Pacific, and then formally annexed in 1929 by the Treaty of Lima. Following annexation, Arica y Parinacota went through a process of forced acculturation known as Chilenization with the aim of creating a dominance of Chilean traditions and culture.

Administration
In 2007, the region was subdivided to create the Arica y Parinacota region and the present day Tarapacá Region to the south. The region is further subdivided into two provinces: Arica and Parinacota.

Demography

According to data from the 2017 Census of the National Statistics Institute, the region is populated by 224,548 inhabitants. Its density reaches 13.3 inhabitants per km².

This region holds the largest population of Aymara and a significant number of immigrants from neighboring Peru and Bolivia. Included are those of Asian descent, such as Chinese and Japanese; and Arabs from Lebanon, Palestine and Syria. Most of the country's Afro-Chileans live in the Arica province, descended from slaves in the 17th and 18th centuries. There are a large number of Roma people or Gypsies in the Arica province as well, originated from Eastern Europe in the late 19th century.

At the level of cities, the most populated are: Arica, with 175,441 inhabitants and Putre, with 1235 inhabitants.

Geography

The region lies within the Norte Grande (Far North) natural region. It combines deserts, green valleys, the steep and volcanic Andes mountains, and the Altiplano (high plain) to the east.

Hydrology
The region's two main rivers are the Lauca, which drains into Bolivia's Coipasa salt flat (Lago Coipasa), and the Lluta, which flows into the Pacific Ocean.

Climate
A desert climate dominates the region. Near the coast, cloudiness can limit the temperature swing throughout the day, but in other drier areas, temperatures can vary greatly as is typical in deserts.

Border dispute with Peru

On 26 January 2007, Peru's government issued a protest against Chile's demarcation of the coastal frontier the two countries share. According to the Peruvian Foreign Ministry, the Chilean legislatures had endorsed a plan regarding the Arica y Parinacota region which did not comply with the current established territorial demarcation. According to the Peruvian Foreign Ministry, Chile has defined a new region "without respecting the Concordia demarcation."

For its part, the Chilean government has asserted that the region in dispute is not a coastal site named Concordia, but instead refers to boundary stone No. 1, which is located to the northeast and 200 meters inland. A possible border dispute was averted when the Chilean Constitutional Court formally ruled on 26 January 2007, against the legislation. While agreeing with the court's ruling, the Chilean government reiterated its stance that the maritime borders between the two nations were not in question and have been formally recognized by the international community. The Peruvian government has stated that it might turn to the international court at The Hague to solve the dispute.

On 27 January 2014, in the final ruling of the International Court of Justice located in The Hague, Peru gained some maritime territory. The maritime boundary extends only to 80 nautical miles off of the coast. From that point, the new border runs in a southwest direction to a point that is 200 miles equidistant from the coast of the two countries.

Under the ruling, Chile lost control over part of its formerly claimed maritime territory and gives additional maritime territory to Peru.

From the 27 January 2014 court press release:

Notable people
 Cristian Garín (born 30 May 1996), professional tennis player.
 Carolina Mestrovic (born 20 July 1991), singer, actress and TV host.
 Vlado Mirosevic (born 23 May 1987), member of the Chamber of Deputies of Chile
 Denisse van Lamoen (born 12 September 1979), first Chilean archer to compete at the Summer Olympics.
 Américo (born 24 December 1977), Tropical music and Chilean cumbia singer.
 Dante Poli (born 15 August 1976), football pundit and former player
 Manuel García (born 1 March 1970), folk-pop singer-songwriter and guitarist
 Humberto Donoso (1938–2000), former football player, played for Chile in the 1966 FIFA World Cup
 Guillermo Billinghurst (born 27 July 1851), Former president of Peru
 Izkia Jasvin Siches Pastén (born 4 March 1986), President of Colegio Médico de Chile
 Osvaldo Hurtado (born 2 November 1957), Former soccer player
 Sergio Hernández (born 27 April 1945), actor

See also

Ancuta
Atacama Desert
Azapa Valley
Caleta Vítor
Chitita
Chucuyo
Climate of Chile
Cosapilla
Esquiña
Geography of Chile
Las Maitas
List of volcanoes in Chile
Molinos
Poconchile
Tignamar

References

External links
Constitutional Court sentence 

 
States and territories established in 2007
Regions of Chile
2007 in Chilean law
2007 establishments in Chile